Byron Nelson Evans (born February 23, 1964) is a former American football linebacker in the National Football League (NFL) for the Philadelphia Eagles defense of the late 1980s and early 1990s.  He played college football at the University of Arizona and was drafted in the fourth round of the 1987 NFL Draft.

Evans was a middle linebacker for some of the Eagles best defenses.  However, he was often overshadowed by teammates on the famed "gang green" defenses of the Eagles such as Reggie White, Jerome Brown, Clyde Simmons and Seth Joyner.

Personal
On January 14, 2009, Evans was a phone guest on the "WIP Radio Show" in, Philadelphia, Pennsylvania. Evans resides in the Phoenix, Arizona. He has three children.

References

1964 births
Players of American football from Phoenix, Arizona
American football linebackers
Arizona Wildcats football players
Living people
Philadelphia Eagles players